Atrato is a municipality and town in the Chocó Department near the Pacific Ocean, Colombia.

Climate
Atrato has an extremely wet tropical rainforest climate (Af). The following climate data is for Yutó, the capital of the municipality.

References
  [ Colombian geografic Institute; Creation of the Atrato municipality]

Municipalities of Chocó Department